The 2015 Duke Blue Devils baseball team will represent Duke University during the 2015 NCAA Division I baseball season. The Blue Devils will play their home games at Jack Coombs Field (sometimes at Durham Bulls Athletic Park)  as a member of the Atlantic Coast Conference. They will be led by head coach Chris Pollard, in his third season at Duke.

Previous season
In 2014, the Blue Devils finished the season 3rd in the ACC's Coastal Division with a record of 33–25, 16–14 in conference play. They qualified for the 2014 Atlantic Coast Conference baseball tournament, and were eliminated in pool play. They failed to qualify for the 2014 NCAA Division I baseball tournament.

Personnel

Roster

Coaching staff

Schedule

! style="background:#0B2174;color:white;"| Regular Season
|- valign="top" 

|- align="center" bgcolor=""
| 1 || February 13 || at  ||  || Evans Diamond • Berkeley, CA ||  ||  ||  ||  ||  ||  ||
|- align="center" bgcolor=""
| 2 || February 14 || at California ||  || Evans Diamond • Berkeley, CA ||  ||  ||  ||  ||  ||  ||
|- align="center" bgcolor=""
| 3 || February 15 || at California ||  || Evans Diamond • Berkeley, CA ||  ||  ||  ||  ||  ||  ||
|- align="center" bgcolor=""
| 4 || February 20 || Hartford ||  || Jack Coombs Field • Durham, NC ||  ||  ||  ||  ||  ||  ||
|- align="center" bgcolor=""
| 5 || February 21 || Delaware State ||  || Jack Coombs Field • Durham, NC ||  ||  ||  ||  ||  ||  ||
|- align="center" bgcolor=""
| 6 || February 22 ||  ||  || Jack Coombs Field • Durham, NC ||  ||  ||  ||  ||  ||  ||
|- align="center" bgcolor=""
| 7 || February 24 || at  ||  || UNCG Baseball Stadium • Greensboro, NC ||  ||  ||  ||  ||  ||  ||
|- align="center" bgcolor=""
| 8 || February 27 ||  ||  || Jack Coombs Field • Durham, NC ||  ||  ||  ||  ||  ||  ||
|- align="center" bgcolor=""
| 9 || February 28 || Rider ||  || Jack Coombs Field • Durham, NC ||  ||  ||  ||  ||  ||  ||
|-

|- align="center" bgcolor=""
| 10 || March 1 || Rider ||  || Jack Coombs Field • Durham, NC ||  ||  ||  ||  ||  ||  ||
|- align="center" bgcolor=""
| 11 || March 3 ||  ||  || Jack Coombs Field • Durham, NC ||  ||  ||  ||  ||  ||  ||
|- align="center" bgcolor=""
| 12 || March 6 || at  ||  || Boshamer Stadium • Chapel Hill, NC ||  ||  ||  ||  ||  ||  ||
|- align="center" bgcolor=""
| 13 || March 7 || at North Carolina ||  || Boshamer Stadium • Chapel Hill, NC ||  ||  ||  ||  ||  ||  ||
|- align="center" bgcolor=""
| 14 || March 8 || at North Carolina ||  || Boshamer Stadium • Chapel Hill, NC ||  ||  ||  ||  ||  ||  ||
|- align="center" bgcolor=""
| 15 || March 10 ||  ||  || Jack Coombs Field • Durham, NC ||  ||  ||  ||  ||  ||  ||
|- align="center" bgcolor=""
| 16 || March 11 ||  ||  || Jack Coombs Field • Durham, NC ||  ||  ||  ||  ||  ||  ||
|- align="center" bgcolor=""
| 17 || March 13 || Georgia Tech ||  || Jack Coombs Field • Durham, NC ||  ||  ||  ||  ||  ||  ||
|- align="center" bgcolor=""
| 18 || March 14 || Georgia Tech ||  || Jack Coombs Field • Durham, NC ||  ||  ||  ||  ||  ||  ||
|- align="center" bgcolor=""
| 19 || March 15 || Georgia Tech ||  || Jack Coombs Field • Durham, NC ||  ||  ||  ||  ||  ||  ||
|- align="center" bgcolor=""
| 20 || March 17 ||  ||  || Durham Bulls Athletic Park • Durham, NC ||  ||  ||  ||  ||  ||  ||
|- align="center" bgcolor=""
| 21 || March 18 || Columbia ||  || Durham Bulls Athletic Park • Durham, NC ||  ||  ||  ||  ||  ||  ||
|- align="center" bgcolor=""
| 22 || March 20 || Pittsburgh ||  || Durham Bulls Athletic Park • Durham, NC ||  ||  ||  ||  ||  ||  ||
|- align="center" bgcolor=""
| 23 || March 21 || Pittsburgh ||  || Durham Bulls Athletic Park • Durham, NC ||  ||  ||  ||  ||  ||  ||
|- align="center" bgcolor=""
| 24 || March 22 || Pittsburgh ||  || Durham Bulls Athletic Park • Durham, NC ||  ||  ||  ||  ||  ||  ||
|- align="center" bgcolor=""
| 25 || March 24 || at Liberty ||  || Liberty Baseball Stadium • Lynchburg, VA ||  ||  ||  ||  ||  ||  ||
|- align="center" bgcolor=""
| 26 || March 27 || at Boston College ||  || Pellagrini Diamond • Chestnut Hill, MA ||  ||  ||  ||  ||  ||  ||
|- align="center" bgcolor=""
| 27 || March 28 || at Boston College ||  || Pellagrini Diamond • Chestnut Hill, MA ||  ||  ||  ||  ||  ||  ||
|- align="center" bgcolor=""
| 28 || March 29 || at Boston College ||  || Pellagrini Diamond • Chestnut Hill, MA ||  ||  ||  ||  ||  ||  ||
|- align="center" bgcolor=""
| 29 || March 31 ||  ||  || Jack Coombs Field • Durham, NC ||  ||  ||  ||  ||  ||  ||
|-

|- align="center" bgcolor=""
| 30 || April 3 || at Miami (FL) ||  || Alex Rodriguez Park • Coral Gables, FL ||  ||  ||  ||  ||  ||  ||
|- align="center" bgcolor=""
| 31 || April 4 || at Miami (FL) ||  || Alex Rodriguez Park • Coral Gables, FL ||  ||  ||  ||  ||  ||  ||
|- align="center" bgcolor=""
| 32 || April 5 || at Miami (FL) ||  || Alex Rodriguez Park • Coral Gables, FL ||  ||  ||  ||  ||  ||  ||
|- align="center" bgcolor=""
| 33 || April 7 ||  ||  || Jack Coombs Field • Durham, NC ||  ||  ||  ||  ||  ||  ||
|- align="center" bgcolor=""
| 34 || April 8 ||  ||  || Durham Bulls Athletic Park • Durham, NC ||  ||  ||  ||  ||  ||  ||
|- align="center" bgcolor=""
| 35 || April 10 || Louisville ||  || Durham Bulls Athletic Park • Durham, NC ||  ||  ||  ||  ||  ||  ||
|- align="center" bgcolor=""
| 36 || April 11 || Louisville ||  || Durham Bulls Athletic Park • Durham, NC ||  ||  ||  ||  ||  ||  ||
|- align="center" bgcolor=""
| 37 || April 12 || Louisville ||  || Durham Bulls Athletic Park • Durham, NC ||  ||  ||  ||  ||  ||  ||
|- align="center" bgcolor=""
| 38 || April 14 || UNC Greensboro ||  || Jack Coombs Field • Durham, NC ||  ||  ||  ||  ||  ||  ||
|- align="center" bgcolor=""
| 39 || April 17 || at Clemson ||  || Doug Kingsmore Stadium • Clemson, SC ||  ||  ||  ||  ||  ||  ||
|- align="center" bgcolor=""
| 40 || April 18 || at Clemson ||  || Doug Kingsmore Stadium • Clemson, SC ||  ||  ||  ||  ||  ||  ||
|- align="center" bgcolor=""
| 41 || April 19 || at Clemson ||  || Doug Kingsmore Stadium • Clemson, SC ||  ||  ||  ||  ||  ||  ||
|- align="center" bgcolor=""
| 42 || April 22 || at East Carolina ||  || Clark–LeClair Stadium • Greenville, NC ||  ||  ||  ||  ||  ||  ||
|- align="center" bgcolor=""
| 43 || April 24 || Virginia Tech ||  || Jack Coombs Field • Durham, NC ||  ||  ||  ||  ||  ||  ||
|- align="center" bgcolor=""
| 44 || April 25 || Virginia Tech ||  || Durham Bulls Athletic Park • Durham, NC ||  ||  ||  ||  ||  ||  ||
|- align="center" bgcolor=""
| 45 || April 26 || Virginia Tech ||  || Jack Coombs Field • Durham, NC ||  ||  ||  ||  ||  ||  ||
|-

|- align="center" bgcolor=""
| 46 || May 3 ||  ||  || Jack Coombs Field • Durham, NC ||  ||  ||  ||  ||  ||  ||
|- align="center" bgcolor=""
| 47 || May 5 || at Davidson ||  || T. Henry Wilson, Jr. Field • Davidson, NC ||  ||  ||  ||  ||  ||  ||
|- align="center" bgcolor=""
| 48 || May 8 || at Virginia ||  || Davenport Field • Charlottesville, VA ||  ||  ||  ||  ||  ||  ||
|- align="center" bgcolor=""
| 49 || May 9 || at Virginia ||  || Davenport Field • Charlottesville, VA ||  ||  ||  ||  ||  ||  ||
|- align="center" bgcolor=""
| 50 || May 10 || at Virginia ||  || Davenport Field • Charlottesville, VA ||  ||  ||  ||  ||  ||  ||
|- align="center" bgcolor=""
| 51 || May 12 ||  ||  || Jack Coombs Field • Durham, NC ||  ||  ||  ||  ||  ||  ||
|- align="center" bgcolor=""
| 52 || May 14 || Wake Forest ||  || Jack Coombs Field • Durham, NC ||  ||  ||  ||  ||  ||  ||
|- align="center" bgcolor=""
| 53 || May 15 || Wake Forest ||  || Jack Coombs Field • Durham, NC ||  ||  ||  ||  ||  ||  ||
|- align="center" bgcolor=""
| 54 || May 16 || Wake Forest ||  || Jack Coombs Field • Durham, NC ||  ||  ||  ||  ||  ||  ||
|-

|- 
! style="background:#0B2174;color:white;"| Post-Season
|-

|- align="center"
|  || May 19 || TBD || || Durham Bulls Athletic Park • Durham, NC ||  ||  ||  ||  ||  ||  || 
|-

All rankings from Collegiate Baseball.

Awards and honors
Michael Matuella
Perfect Game USA Pre-season Third Team All-American
 Baseball America Pre-season First team All-American

References

Duke Blue Devils
Duke Blue Devils baseball seasons